Dolichotrigona is a genus of bees belonging to the family Apidae.

Species:

Dolichotrigona longitarsis 
Dolichotrigona martinezi 
Dolichotrigona schulthessi 
Dolichotrigona mendersoni 
Dolichotrigona clavicornis 
Dolichotrigona rondoni 
Dolichotrigona tavaresi 
Dolichotrigona browni 
Dolichotrigona moratoi 
Dolichotrigona chachapoya

References

Apidae